Opera Europa is the international service organisation for professional opera companies and opera festivals in Europe. It is incorporated in Brussels as a not-for-profit organisation.

With roots going back to 1995, Opera Europa gained its present format and name in 2002, on the merger of the European Opera Network and the Eurolyrica associations. It had 204 member companies in 43 different countries as of May 2020.

Activities
For the benefit of its member companies, it runs forums, databases, a quarterly newsletter, and twice-yearly conferences, and offers reciprocal membership benefits with Opera America.

European Opera Days
Opera Europa co-ordinates the annual European Opera Days when opera companies across Europe open their doors to the general public, with opera house tours, open rehearsals, talks and special events (both in and outside the conventional spaces).  The first European Opera Days were held in 2007, and since then have taken place each year on the weekend closest to the EU's Europe Day, 9 May.

The Opera Platform
Opera Europa is the lead partner behind The Opera Platform, a service launched in May 2015 to offer free live streams of operas via the web.  The three-year project to stream one free production every month received half of its 3.9 million euro budget from the European Union's Creative Europe programme, the other half coming from the 15 opera companies providing the content.  The Franco-German TV network Arte is providing the technological platform.

The Opera Platform won the Accessibility category in the 2016 edition of the International Opera Awards.

European Opera-directing Prize (EOP)
In collaboration with the Camerata Nuova e.V. in Wiesbaden, Opera Europa supports a biennial competition, the European Opera-directing Prize (EOP, in German: Europäischen Opernregie-Preis) for young opera directors and design teams up to the age of 35.  Competition is fierce with more than 200 teams applying in 2009.  The winning team receive prize money of 35,000 euros, but perhaps more importantly have their production mounted by a European opera company, receiving mentoring and support for this process.

References

Sources
Opera Europa website
Camerata Nuova e.V., Wiesbaden website 

Opera organizations
Arts organizations established in 1995
Music organisations based in Belgium